Mass spectrometry software is software used for data acquisition, analysis, or representation in mass spectrometry.

Proteomics software 

In protein mass spectrometry, tandem mass spectrometry (also known as MS/MS or MS2) experiments are used for protein/peptide identification. Peptide identification algorithms fall into two broad classes: database search and de novo search. The former search takes place against a database containing all amino acid sequences assumed to be present in the analyzed sample, whereas the latter infers peptide sequences without knowledge of genomic data.

Database search algorithms

De novo sequencing algorithms 
De novo peptide sequencing algorithms are based, in general, on the approach proposed in Bartels  et al. (1990).

Homology searching algorithms

MS/MS peptide quantification

Other software

See also 
 Mass spectrometry data format: for a list of mass spectrometry data viewers and format converters.
 List of protein structure prediction software

References

External links 

 

List
Proteomics
Lists of bioinformatics software